Golf coverage on ESPN has been a regular feature of the cable sports channels' programming since soon after ESPN's launch in the United States in 1979.

Although ESPN no longer owns any share of the rights to the week-to-week events on the PGA Tour, LPGA Tour, or Champions Tour, it is the cable rightsholder for two of the men's majors as of 2020 — the Masters Tournament (since 2008) and the PGA Championship (since 2020). In both cases, the telecasts are produced in association with CBS Sports (which serves as the U.S. broadcast television rightsholder for both tournaments) and have incorporated talent from the network's own golf telecasts.

Coverage history since 2010
Continued from PGA Tour on ABC

Prior to 2007, ESPN and ABC shared some announcers, but the main ABC coverage team did not generally work on ESPN except for events that ABC had weekend rights to, in which case the full ABC team would work on ESPN's weekday telecasts.  After losing PGA Tour rights following the 2006 season, what remained of ESPN and ABC's coverage team's merged, as did the production, with all ABC broadcasts being branded as ESPN broadcasts as part of ESPN on ABC.  History of the ESPN golf team during the period when some telecasts were still shown on ABC (2007–2009) can be found at the PGA Tour on ABC article.

2010–present
In 2010, all coverage was moved to ESPN, with highlight presentations being shown on ABC during the afternoons on Open Championship weekend.  This meant that in 2010, for regular men's golf, ESPN showed The Masters, the U.S. Open, the Open Championship, and the Ryder Cup.

ESPN revamped its coverage team in 2010 as well. Mike Tirico and Paul Azinger remained the lead booth announcers. Curtis Strange returned as a hole announcer, while Scott Van Pelt moved from the studio host position to become a hole announcer as well. Sean McDonough joined the coverage team as another hole announcer.  Andy North, Judy Rankin and Billy Kratzert all returned as on-course reporters. Terry Gannon moved from a hole announcer role to the role of studio host during live coverage, for highlight updates. Tom Weiskopf, who had been a hole announcer, became an analyst for holes Van Pelt was assigned to, and was joined by Peter Alliss in this role for one hour per day at the Open Championship. At the Ryder Cup, Alliss took Van Pelt's place as a hole announcer, while Van Pelt and Weiskopf worked on the studio set. Tom Rinaldi remained the lead interviewer and essayist.

In 2011, Olin Browne joined as an additional on-course reporter. Alliss began to only appear as a guest at the Open Championship, still for one hour per day, and still working as Van Pelt's analyst.  In 2012, Gannon's role was eliminated and he joined NBC Sports and the Golf Channel.

2012 would also be ESPN's final Ryder Cup. The network traded its Friday rights to the 2014 event back to NBC for additional Premier League highlights. NBC then signed a rights deal covering the 2016–2030 editions of the event, ending ESPN's chances of a comeback.

Several changes occurred in 2013. Dottie Pepper replaced Browne as an on-course reporter. Weiskopf was moved to a position in which he would appear once during the telecast to discuss the architecture of the course and how it would affect play, as he is a noted course designer. Alliss also had his guest role cut to only Thursday and Friday coverage of the Open Championship. However, his role as an analyst for holes Van Pelt is assigned to is unchanged for those days.

In 2015, Weiskopf left to be a studio analyst for Fox Sports' coverage of USGA tournaments.

From 2008–2014, guest analysts were used during the Open Championship, in various roles, usually for a few hours each day scheduled around their own play in the event. Tom Watson fulfilled this role from 2008 to 2010 and David Duval performed this duty from 2011 through 2014.

The 2015 Open Championship was the final event covered by the full ESPN/ABC team, nine years after first losing rights to the PGA Tour. Several members of the team did cover one more event, the LPGA's CME Group Tour Championship in December 2015.

Since 2008, ESPN has carried early-round coverage of the Masters Tournament, which remained the only major professional golf event still carried by ESPN until 2020. This coverage is co-produced by CBS Sports as part of its presentation of the event, and largely features its personalities, joined by an ESPN studio host (initially Mike Tirico before his departure for NBC, and later Scott Van Pelt).

In October 2018, it was announced that early-round and weekend morning coverage of the PGA Championship would move from TNT to ESPN beginning 2020, with ESPN+ holding rights to stream supplemental coverage prior to ESPN's broadcast window, and during CBS weekend windows. As with the Masters, the coverage is co-produced by CBS Sports with the involvement of personalities from both networks.

For the 2022 PGA Championship, ESPN announced that it would air a secondary broadcast modeled after its Monday Night Football with Peyton and Eli broadcasts for Monday Night Football, which will feature ESPN's new lead NFL commentator Joe Buck (in his first on-air appearance at ESPN after leaving Fox—where he had also briefly served as a golf commentator), ESPN golf analyst Michael Collins, and various celebrity guests (such as Buck's NFL partner Troy Aikman, Fred Couples, Ken Griffey Jr., J. J. Watt, and Peyton and Eli Manning—who will produce the broadcast, among others). It will serve as the opening hour of ESPN's coverage for each round of the tournament, after which it will air on ESPN2 (first and second rounds) or ESPN+ (third and final rounds).

Tournaments

Current

PGA Tour
The Masters, first two rounds (2008–present)
PGA Championship, first two rounds and early weekend coverage (1982–1990, 2020–present)
PGA Tour Live: Live coverage of 35 tournaments on ESPN+.
Amateur events
Latin America Amateur Championship, all four rounds (2015–present)
Asia-Pacific Amateur Championship, all four rounds (2013–present)

Former

PGA Tour
Regular season events from 1984–2006
U.S. Open, first two rounds (1982–2014)
The Open Championship, first two rounds (1982–2002), all four rounds (2010–2015)
World Golf Championships (1999–2006)
Tour Championship (1991–2006)
LPGA
Regular season events from 1979–2009
Kraft Nabisco Championship, first two rounds (1983–2005), first three rounds (2006–2010)
U.S. Women's Open, first two rounds (1982–2014)
Women's British Open, first two rounds (1982–2002), all four rounds (2010–2015)
CME Group Tour Championship, final round (aired on ABC, see ESPN on ABC) (2015–2018)
Champions Tour
Regular season events from 1982–2000
The Tradition, first two rounds (1998–2002)
Senior PGA Championship, first two rounds (1997–2005)
U.S. Senior Open, first two rounds (1986–2014)
Senior Players Championship, first two rounds (1999–2002)
Senior Open Championship, first two rounds (1982–2002), all four rounds (2010–2015)
Senior Tour Championship (1997-2000)
Ryder Cup (2008, 2010 and 2012)
Presidents Cup (1994, 1996 and 1998)

Announcers

Scott Van Pelt is currently the lead golf host for ESPN.

References

1970s American television series
1980s American television series
1990s American television series
2000s American television series
2010s American television series
2020s American television series
Sports telecast series
ESPN
1979 American television series debuts
ESPN original programming
ESPN2 original programming